Bardagoriya is a rural municipality in Kailali District of Nepal.
Bardagoriya Rural Municipality lies 65 km east of Dhangadhi and 605 km west of the capital, Kathmandu. It is surrounded by Ghodaghodi Municipality to the west, Lamki Chuha Municipality to the east, Joshipur Rural Municipality to the south and Mohanyal to the north. Bauniya Bazar is its largest market.

Public Services 
Bardagoriya Rural Municipality is connected to the Mahendra Highway, which is the longest highway of Nepal, where transport includes auto rickshaws, public minibuses and public city buses. Karnali River Yatayat and Sudurpachim Yatayat provides regular bus services provides regular service in Kailali District.

Bardagoriya Rural Municipality has many private and government schools and high schools like basant murari and sunrise.

Land Seizure 
On July 31, 2019, 43 bigha and 17 kathha (roughly 297,000 m2) of land was seized by the revolutionary Communist Party of Nepal under the name of Tharuwan Autonomous Province Bardagoriya People’s Council Nepal.

See also
 Lamki Chuha Municipality
 Sudurpashchim Province
 Dhangadhi

References

 

Rural municipalities in Kailali District
Populated places in Kailali District
Rural municipalities of Nepal established in 2017